Alexandru Iuliu Csepreghi (born 28 March 1987) is a Romanian handballer who plays for Minaur Baia Mare and the Romania national team.

Achievements
Liga Națională:
Gold Medalist: 2009, 2010, 2011, 2012, 2013, 2014
Silver Medalist: 2008
Bronze Medalist: 2005
Cupa României:
Winner: 2011, 2012, 2013, 2014
Supercupa României:
Winner: 2008, 2011, 2013
EHF Cup:
Fourth place: 2014
EHF Cup Winners' Cup: 
Quarterfinalist: 2007, 2009

Individual awards
 Liga Națională Top Scorer: 2019 
 Gala Premiilor Handbalului Românesc Liga Națională Most Valuable Player: 2019

Personal life
His mother was also a handball player. Csepreghi is married since 2010.

References

1987 births
Living people
Sportspeople from Baia Mare
Romanian male handball players
HC Dobrogea Sud Constanța players
Romanian expatriates in France
Expatriate handball players